Sergio Endrigo (15 June 1933 – 7 September 2005) was an Italian singer-songwriter.

Born in Pola, Istria in Italy (now Pula, Croatia), he has been often compared—for style and nature—to authors of the so-called "Genoa school" like Gino Paoli, Fabrizio De André, Luigi Tenco, and Bruno Lauzi.

He won the Sanremo Music Festival in 1968 with the song "Canzone per te", sung with Roberto Carlos. The same year he represented Italy at the Eurovision Song Contest 1968 with the song "Marianne." His hits also include "L'arca di Noè", "Io che amo solo te" and "Adesso sì".

Discography

Album 
1962 – Sergio Endrigo
1963 – Endrigo
1966 – Endrigo
1968 – Endrigo
1969 – La vita, amico, è l'arte dell'incontro
1969 – I più grandi successi di Sergio Endrigo
1969 – Sergio Endrigo
1971 – Nuove canzoni d'amore
1972 – Diez Canciones De Amor
1972 – L'Arca
1974 – La voce dell'uomo
1974 – Ci vuole un fiore
1975 – Endrigo dieci anni dopo
1976 – Canzoni venete
1976 – Alle origini della mafia
1977 – Elisa
1977 – Sarebbe bello...
1978 – Donna mal d'Africa
1979 – Exclusivamente Brasil
1980 – A Arte de Sergio Endrigo
1980 – En Castellano
1981 – ...e noi amiamoci
1982 – Mari del sud
1982 – Se necessita una flor
1986 – E allora balliamo
1988 – Il giardino di Giovanni
1993 – Qualcosa di meglio
1996 – Il meglio
2003 – Altre emozioni
2004 – Cjantant Endrigo dut par furlan/Cantando Endrigo in lingua friulana
2010 – Si comincia a cantare

Singles

External links
Official website: biography, discography, filmography (in Italian)
Istria on the Internet, Prominent Istrians

 

1933 births
2005 deaths
People from Pula
Italian male  singer-songwriters
Eurovision Song Contest entrants for Italy
Eurovision Song Contest entrants of 1968
Istrian Italian people
Sanremo Music Festival winners
20th-century Italian male  singers